Professor John Sydney Oxford (born 6 March 1942) is an English virologist and a professor at Queen Mary, University of London. He is a leading expert on influenza, including bird flu and the 1918 Spanish Influenza, and HIV/AIDS.

Education
Oxford was educated at the University of Reading, gaining a Bachelor of Science degree in 1963 and the University of Sheffield where he was awarded a  PhD in 1966.

Research
Oxford is noted for his work with  Retroscreen Virology, a virology research company which he established in 1989 with EU funding.

References

External links
Queen Mary, University of London page

British virologists
Living people
1942 births
Academics of Queen Mary University of London
Alumni of the University of Reading
Alumni of the University of Sheffield